Étrun is a commune in the Pas-de-Calais department in the Hauts-de-France region of France.

Geography
The river Gy flows through the commune.

Population

Places of interest
 The church of St.Nicholas, dating from the seventeenth century.
 The Duisans British Cemetery, a WW-I Commonwealth War Graves Commission cemetery.
 The remnants of an old chateau.

See also
Communes of the Pas-de-Calais department

References

External links

 The CWGC cemetery at Étrun

Communes of Pas-de-Calais